The Pariacaca mountain range (possibly from Quechua parya reddish, sparrow, qaqa rock, Paryaqaqa or Parya Qaqa, a regional deity, a mountain god (apu)), also called Huarochirí mountain range  lies in the Andes of Peru. It is located in the Junín Region, in the provinces of Jauja and Yauli, and in the Lima Region, in the provinces of Huarochirí and Yauyos. It is part of the Cordillera Central of Peru.

Mountains 
Other peaks are listed below:

 Tunshu,  
 Colquepucro, 
 Carhuachuco,  
 Paka, 
 Suyruqucha, 
 Huallacancha, 
 Antachaire, 
 Nina Ukru, 
 Pachanqutu, 
 Paqcha, 
 Wayllakancha, 
 Kunkus Yantaq, 
 Wararayuq, 
 Tuku Mach'ay, 
 Putka,  
 Qayqu,  
 Tata Qayqu,  
 Yantayuq,  
 Chumpi,  
 Ch'uspi,  
 Quriwasi, 
 Uqhu,  
 Ukhu Qhata, 
 Wiqu,  
 Wamanripa,  
 Kiwyu Waqanan,  
 Qayqu,  
 Chhuqu P'ukru,  
 Parya Chaka,  
 Kunkus,  
 Kunkus (Yauli),  
 Suyuq,  
 Turiyuq,  
 Uqsha Wallqa,  
 Wallapi,

Toponyms 
Many of the toponyms of the Junín Region and the Lima Region originate from Quechua. Their Spanish-based orthography, however, is in conflict with the normalized alphabet of the language. According to Article 20 of Decreto Supremo No 004-2016-MC (Supreme Decree) which approves the Regulations to Law 29735, published in the  official newspaper El Peruano on July 22, 2016, adequate spellings of the toponyms in the normalized alphabets of the indigenous languages must progressively be proposed with the aim of standardizing the namings used by the National Geographic Institute (Instituto Geográfico Nacional, IGN) The National Geographic Institute realizes the necessary changes in the official maps of Peru. The formerly official maps of Peru have been withdrawn from the websites of the IGN.

The recovery and revitalisation of the indigenous languages is also a means to fight discrimination by the use of the language that affects speakers of the native languages in Peru and to promote respectful coexistence in a multicultural and multilingual society (Article 24).

References

External links 

Mountain ranges of Peru
Mountain ranges of Junín Region
Mountain ranges of Lima Region